Lucas Liss (born 12 January 1992) is a German former cyclist, who currently works as a directeur sportif for UCI Continental team . He won a gold medal at the scratch event at the 2015 UCI Track Cycling World Championships and gold and a silver medal at the 2012 European Track Championships.

His father Lucjan Lis was a silver medal winning Polish Olympic cyclist and later Lucas' coach and manager.

Major results

Road
2010
 1st Stage 3 Niedersachsen-Rundfahrt
2016
 1st Prologue Tour de Normandie

References

External links

1992 births
Living people
German male cyclists
German people of Polish descent
People from Unna
Sportspeople from Arnsberg (region)
Cyclists from North Rhine-Westphalia
Directeur sportifs